George Hilton (born Jorge Hill Acosta y Lara; 16 July 1934 – 28 July 2019) was a Uruguayan actor well known for his many Spaghetti Western performances. Sometimes credited as Jorge Hilton, he appeared in over 20 Euro-Westerns as well as several giallo and action films.

Biography 
Born in Montevideo. He began his career working in radio. In 1955, he moved to Argentina, adopting the pseudonym Jorge Hilton. He soon began to appear in several soap operas and film production for Argentina's domestic market.

In 1963 he moved to Italy, following the footsteps of other famous South American actors such as the Argentines Jorge Rigaud and Alberto de Mendoza, who were attracted by the thriving Italian film industry of the '60s. After Anglicizing his name to George, he got the lead role in The Masked Man Against the Pirates (Il corsaro nero nell'isola del Tesoro, 1965) and appeared in the Franco and Ciccio Bond spoof comedy Due mafiosi contro Goldginger, directed by Giorgio Simonelli.

His career in the Euro-western genre was launched by director Lucio Fulci with the film Massacre Time (1966), starring Franco Nero, where his supporting role made him an instant icon in the genre. In 1967 he appeared to even greater effect as "Stranger" in Any Gun Can Play (also known as Go Kill and Come Back) with Edd Byrnes and Gilbert Roland. In the following year he participated in seven productions, enhancing his international reputation and garnering him significant attention, especially in Spain. Soon Hilton became one of the major stars of Spaghetti Westerns, eventually playing Sartana in the last film of the "Sartana" series, Sartana's Here… Trade Your Pistol for a Coffin, after Gianni Garko left the role. His most famous character is arguably that of the gunslinger Allelujah (or Hallelujah) in They Call Me Hallelujah (1971), created with director Giuliano Carnimeo, who also directed the sequel involving the same character (Return of Hallelujah, 1972) as well as Man Called Invincible (1973), in which Hilton played Tresette, another of his famous roles. Besides westerns, Hilton starred in numerous "gialli", mostly in the 1970s and many directed by Sergio Martino or Tonino Valerii —who directed Hilton in the classic mistery film My Dear Killer (1972)—, as well as more conventional crime and action films after the Spaghetti Western craze ended in the 1980s.

During the 1990s, Hilton appeared mostly in television series. In his last years Hilton reduced his film appearances but nevertheless remained active, being still fondly remembered as one of the biggest stars of Italian cinema, along with Terence Hill, Franco Nero and Giuliano Gemma. His legacy as a film star also remained intact, with Hilton asked to do many interviews and retrospectives on his film career on a regular basis.

On 28 July 2019, Hilton died at a clinic in Rome, Italy, at the age of 85, after suffering of a long undisclosed illness. The funeral was held the next day at 4.30 pm local time, at the Santa Maria in Montesanto in Piazza del Popolo.

Selected filmography 

  (1956)
  (1956) – Minor Role
  (1957)
  (1958) – Luis
  (1960)
  (1960)
  (1963)
  (1963)
 The Masked Man Against the Pirates (1964) – Suarez
 Two Mafiosi Against Goldfinger (1965) – 007
 Massacre Time (1966) – Jeff 'Slim' Corbett
 Two Sons of Ringo (1966) – Joe
 Kitosch, the Man Who Came from the North (1967) – David Kitosch
 Poker with Pistols (1967) – Ponson
  (1967) – Kitosch
  (1967) – Teddy Jason
 Her Harem (1967) – (uncredited)
 Any Gun Can Play (1967) – The Stranger / Lo Straniero / Django / - un cacciatore di taglie
 Halleluja for Django (1967) – Billy 'Rum' Cooney
 Red Blood, Yellow Gold (1967) – Tim Dooley
 The Ruthless Four (1968) – Manolo Sanchez
 The Sweet Body of Deborah (1968) – Robert Simack
 The Moment to Kill (1968) – Lord
 One More to Hell (1968) – Johnny King
 Trusting Is Good... Shooting Is Better (1968) – Glenn Reno
 The Battle of El Alamein (1969) – Lt. Graham
  (1969) – Captain George Bradbury
 Salt in the Wound (1969) – Michael Sheppard
 A Bullet for Sandoval (1969) – Corporal John Warner
  (1969) – Mike Russo
  (1970) – Sartana
 The Strange Vice of Mrs. Wardh (1971) – George Corro
 They Call Me Hallelujah (1971) – Alleluja
 The Case of the Scorpion's Tail (1971) – Peter Lynch
 The Devil Has Seven Faces (1972) – Tony Shane
 My Dear Killer (1972) – Inspector Luca Peretti
 All the Colors of the Dark (1972) – Richard Steele
 The Two Faces of Fear (1972) – Dr. Roberto Carli
 The Case of the Bloody Iris (1972) – Andrea Antinori
 Return of Hallelujah (1972) – Alleluja
 Holy God, Here Comes the Passatore! (1973) – Stefano Pelloni, il 'Passatore'
 Man Called Invincible (1973) – Tresette / Tricky Dicky
  (1973) – James McDougall
 Seven Hours of Violence (1973) – George Anderson
  (1974) – Tresette / Tricky Dicky
 The Silkworm (1974) – Didier
 The Killer Must Kill Again (1975) – Giorgio
 Trinity Plus the Clown and a Guitar (1975) – Johnny Chitara / Johnny Guitar
 Mark of Zorro (1975) – Philip Mackintosh / Don Alba de Mendoza
 Taxi Girl (1977) – Ramon
 El Macho (1977) – Hidalgo, the Duke
 Sweetly You'll Die Through Love (1977) – Carlos
 Double Game (1977) – Insp. Ugo Moretti
 Blazing Flowers (1978) – Commissioner Morani
  (1979)
  (1981) – Capo Terrorista Boodoostano
 Don't Play with Tigers (1982) – Prince Omar Abdul Yussef El Rahid
 The Secret Nights of Lucrezia Borgia (1982) – Duccio
 The Atlantis Interceptors (1983) – Professor Peter Saunders
 College (1984)
 Dinner with a Vampire (1989, TV Series) – Jurek
 Double Game (1989)
 College (1990, TV Series) – Colonnello Madison
  (1993) – Alfredo
  (1994) – Miccichè
 Fireworks (1997) – Gerard de la Fasse
 Cient' anne (1999) – Mauro De Angelis
 Killer's Playlist (2006) – Commissario
 Natale in crociera (2007) – Comandante della Nave

References

External links 
 
 
 "Tiempo de masacre/Massacre Time" (Le colt cantarono la morte e fu... tempo di massacro – 1966) and studio interview with George Hilton 27 Nov 2018, Filmoteca, Film Themes (on YouTube) 

1934 births
2019 deaths
Expatriate male actors in Italy
Male Spaghetti Western actors
Male actors from Montevideo
Uruguayan male film actors
English male film actors
20th-century Uruguayan male actors